European whitefish can refer to several fish in the genus Coregonus:

Coregonus lavaretus, also known as the common whitefish
Coregonus macrophthalmus, from Lake Konstanz
Coregonus maraena, from the Baltic region